Alice Mamaga Akosua Amoako is a Ghanaian social entrepreneur and the founder of Autism Ambassadors of Ghana. She is one of the developers of the Autism Aid app.

Early life and education 
At the age of 13, Amoako's mother encouraged her to join a youth radio program named 'Curious Minds' to improve her knowledge and consider contributing to developmental projects in her community. Later, Amoako attended Ghana Telecom University college and  received her Bachelor of Information Technology in 2015.

Career 
In 2014, Amoako founded the Autism Ambassadors of Ghana, an autism awareness organisation centred on supporting autistic children. This programme brings together professionals and volunteers to promote autism awareness as well as improve the lives of autistic people through technology. 

As part of the Autism Ambassadors of Ghana, Amoako co-developed the Android application Autism Aid with Solomon Avemegah. The app is the first of its kind for autistic children living in Ghana and West Africa. It provides alternative and augmentative communication for the children and offers relevant healthcare resources.

Amoako is also a member of the national committee of the United Nations Convention on the Rights of Persons with Disabilities. In 2016, she was part of a panel at the World Youth Summit of Girl Guides. She also represented Ghana at the Global Social Hackathon in Sweden.

Awards

References 

Living people
Autism activists
Year of birth missing (living people)
Social entrepreneurs
Ghanaian businesspeople
Ghanaian activists
Ghanaian women scientists
Ghanaian women computer scientists
Ghanaian computer scientists